Debra Hand is a self-taught artist and sculptor from Chicago, Illinois.

She created a bronze statue of the poet Paul Laurence Dunbar, after receiving a commission to do so from the Chicago Park District in 2012.

History
It was at the prestigious DuSable Museum of African American History where Hand first publicly unveiled her work.

The unveiling was arranged by the museum's principal founder, Dr. Margaret Taylor-Burroughs who took a personal interest in Hand's work and showcased her during Burrough's historic "Lifetime in the Arts" retrospective exhibit at the museum. It was during this momentous occasion that she invited Debra Hand on stage and introduced her to a packed audience of art patrons and dignitaries as an emerging-artist with great potential; one that they should watch for on Chicago's fine-art scene.

Since the museum presentation, Hand's rise to prominence has continued steadily. Debra Hand's work can be found in diverse collections ranging from Museum collections such as the Smithsonian Anacostia Museum – which acquired a cello by Debra Hand – to corporate and private collections.

Hand's body of work is noted for its contemporary and figurative sculptures, dancers, musicians, and stringed instruments. The collection of stringed instruments titled "Strings Attached' was created after she was given a real violin by the Illinois Philharmonic Orchestra and challenged to use it as a canvas for a work of art.

Hand's sculptures, paintings and stringed-instruments have been filmed by every major network in Chicago and in 2005 she was featured by Harry Porterfield of WLS-TV, as "Someone You Should Know." Her work has also been featured in "Curators of Culture" an Emmy-Award-winning documentary by producer, Rita Coburn Whack. The film traces the history of the South Side Community Arts Center (SSCAC), one of Chicago's great art institutions. The SSCAC, like the DuSable Museum in Chicago, was also cofounded by the esteemed Dr. Margaret Taylor-Burroughs who stood alongside Eleanor Roosevelt (wife of President Franklin D. Roosevelt) as the ribbons were cut to this great Works Progress Administration institution. In 2010, when the SSCAC decided to honor Anne "Anna" Roosevelt, the granddaughter of the late President Roosevelt and First Lady Eleanor, along with her grandparents, posthumously, the SSCAC chose Debra Hand to create and present the award sculpture at the Harris Theater in Chicago during the SSCAC's 70th anniversary celebration and their commissioned performance of "Off The Walls and Onto the Stage."

Works by  Hand can be found in prestigious and historic collections such as that of the DuSable Museum, the Smithsonian Institution Anacostia Museum, the United Negro College Fund and the Plaze Club located atop the Prudential Building in downtown Chicago. Works by Debra Hand also appear in many publications including "The Art of Culture - Evolution of Visual Art by African-American Artists" published by the Africa International House, "African Art: The Diaspora and Beyond" by author Daniel Parker, DTEX publishing; and in nationally distributed magazines.

References

Living people
Artists from Chicago
American women sculptors
Place of birth missing (living people)
Year of birth missing (living people)
Sculptors from Illinois
21st-century American women artists